Aleksandrovo may refer to several geographical locations:

In Croatia 

 Ploče, a town in Split-Dalmatia County, formerly known as Aleksandrovo

In Serbia 

 Aleksandrovo, Merošina, a village in Nišava District
 Aleksandrovo, Nova Crnja, a village in Nova Crnja municipality, Vojvodina, Serbia
 Aleksandrovo, Subotica, a city quarter of Subotica, Vojvodina, Serbia

In Bulgaria 

 Aleksandrovo kurgan, a Thracian kurgan in south-eastern Bulgaria
 Aleksandrovo, Burgas Province, Burgas Province
 Aleksandrovo, Haskovo Province, Haskovo Province
 Aleksandrovo, Lovech Province, Lovech Province
 Aleksandrovo, Shumen Province, Shumen Province
 Aleksandrovo, Stara Zagora Province, Stara Zagora Province
 Aleksandrovo, Targovishte Province, Targovishte Province
 Aleksandrovo, Veliko Tarnovo Province, Veliko Tarnovo Province
 Aleksandrovo, Yambol Province, Yambol Province